Amrutlal Laljee Bhatt (1916–2002), better known by his pen name Amrut Ghayal, was a Gujarati language poet from India.

Life
Amrutlal Bhatt was born in Sardhar near Rajkot on 19 August 1916 to Lalji Bhatt and Santokben. He studied up to seventh standard in Sardhar. He served as a personal secretary of prince of Pajod state, a small princely state of Saurashtra, Khan Imamuddin Babi aka Ruswa Mazlumi, from 1938 to 1948. He passed matriculation in 1949 and joined Bachelor of Arts from Dharmendrasinhji Arts College, Rajkot but left studies after first year. He joined public works department of Rajkot in 1949 as an accountant and was retired in 1973. He settled in Rajkot following his retirement.

He died on 25 December 2002 at Rajkot.

Works
His pen name Ghayal literally means wounded. Already being a good scholar of Urdu and Persian poetry, Amrit Ghayal flourished into an outstanding Ghazal poet of Gujarati by 1940 once he started writing the Gujarati poetry. His poetry is known for "Jusso" (morale) "Jom" (spirit) and "Mijaj" (attitude or style). His language has been influenced by the vocabulary of Saurashtra region to which place he belonged.

In 1954, his first poetry collection Shula ane Shamana (Throns and Dreams) was published. His other collections are Rang (Colour, 1960), Roop (Beauty, 1967), Jhay (Shade, 1982), Agni (Fire, 1982) and Gazal Name Sukh (Happiness in name of poetry, 1984).

Awards
He received Sheikhadam Abuwala award for 1992–93. He was also awarded Ranjitram Suvarna Chandrak in 1993 and Gujarat Sahitya Akademi award in 1994. He received Kalapi Award in 1997.

References

1916 births
2002 deaths
Gujarati-language poets
20th-century Indian poets
People from Rajkot district
Indian male poets
Poets from Gujarat
Recipients of the Ranjitram Suvarna Chandrak
20th-century Indian male writers